Uwe Brauer (born 11 July 1962) is a West German former basketball player. He competed in the men's tournament at the 1984 Summer Olympics.

References

External links
 

1962 births
Living people
German men's basketball players
Olympic basketball players of West Germany
Basketball players at the 1984 Summer Olympics
Sportspeople from Leverkusen